Matwé Middelkoop (born 3 September 1983) is a Dutch professional tennis player who specialises in doubles.
He has won 14 doubles titles on the ATP Tour, most notably the 2022 Rotterdam Open alongside Robin Haase, and reached a career high doubles ranking of world No. 18 on 6 February 2023.
 
Middelkoop has reached the 2022 French Open semifinal in doubles and the 2019 Wimbledon Championships semifinal in mixed doubles, and two more Grand Slam quarterfinals in men's doubles, at the 2017 US Open and at the 2021 Australian Open. In singles, Middelkoop reached his highest ranking of world No. 197 in November 2008. He has represented the Netherlands in the Davis Cup since 2009, and holds a 3–1 record.

Professional career
Middelkoop has reached 93 doubles finals in his career, with a record of 51 wins and 42 losses. This includes a record of 14–17 in ATP finals, 15–14 in ATP Challenger finals and 22–11 in ITF Futures finals. Additionally, he has reached 28 career singles finals, with a record of 15 wins and 13 losses. All of the singles finals he has appeared in have come at the ITF Futures level with the exception of one, when he lost the 2012 The Hague Open challenger tournament in Scheveningen, Netherlands to Jerzy Janowicz of Poland in straight sets 2–6, 2–6.

Singles
Middelkoop has played most of his singles career on the Futures circuit.

Middelkoop made his ATP Tour singles debut in 2008 at the Ordina Open on the grass courts of 's-Hertogenbosch, Netherlands, when he was granted entry into the main draw as a lucky loser. In qualifying, he received a bye in the first round, then advanced through the second round when opponent Robert Lindstedt of Sweden retired in the third set while trailing 6–3, 4–6, 2–3, but was then defeated in the final round by German Benjamin Becker in straight sets 2–6, 4–6. He entered the main draw as a lucky loser recipient after Finland's Jarkko Nieminen withdrew with a right heel injury, however he was promptly defeated by eventual runner-up Marc Gicquel of France again in straight sets 4–6, 1–6.

Doubles

2008: ATP debut
Middelkoop made his ATP Tour doubles debut at the 2008 ABN AMRO World Tennis Tournament held on hard courts in Rotterdam, Netherlands. He was granted a direct acceptance into the doubles draw alongside compatriot Jesse Huta Galung, however they would be defeated in the first round by second seeds and eventual semi-finalists Julian Knowle and Simon Aspelin in straight sets 3–6, 5–7.

2016-2017: First Major quarterfinal, Maiden title & three more ATP 250 titles
Middelkoop won his maiden ATP tour doubles title at the 2016 Sofia Open on indoor hard courts in Bulgaria, partnering compatriot Wesley Koolhof. The pair defeated Adil Shamasdin and Philipp Oswald in a third set tie-breaker 5–7, 7–6(11–9), [10–6] in the championship match to capture the title.

2018-2020: Five more titles & ten finals, Top 30 career-high

2021: Second Major quarterfinal, Masters semifinal, Three titles, top 30 return
2021 was the most successful year after 2018 on the ATP tour in Middelkoop’s professional career. With his partner Marcelo Arévalo, the pair reached the quarterfinals of the 2021 Australian Open and the semifinals of the 2021 Italian Open (tennis) defeating home favorites Fognini/Musetti in the round of 16 and Dutch pair Koolhof/Rojer in the quarterfinals. As a result he returned to the top 40 in the doubles rankings.

At the 2021 Winston-Salem Open, he won his tenth title partnering Arévalo when they defeated Ivan Dodig and Austin Krajicek in the final. As a result he reentered the top 30 at a new career-high of World No. 28 on 30 August 2021.

2022: First ATP 500 title, French Open semifinalist, top 25 debut, 30th final
At the 2022 ABN AMRO World Tennis Tournament he won his first ATP 500 title with Robin Haase. As a result he reached a career-high ranking of World No. 26 on 14 February 2022.

At the 2022 French Open he reached the semifinals for the first time at a Grand Slam in his career partnering Rohan Bopanna defeating en route the second seeds, former World No. 1 pair and 2021 Wimbledon champions Nikola Mektic/Mate Pavic.

He reached a career-high in the top 25 on 27 June 2022 at the start of the 2022 Wimbledon Championships.

2023: Top 20 debut and ATP title
He reached the top 20 at world No. 19 on 30 January 2023.

At the 2023 Open Sud de France reached his thirty first doubles final partnering compatriot Haase. He won his fourteenth title defeating Maxime Cressy/Albano Olivetti.

ATP Tour career finals

Doubles: 31 (14 titles, 17 runner-ups)

ATP Challenger and ITF Futures finals

Singles: 28 (15–13)

Doubles: 62 (37–25)

Performance timelines

Singles

Doubles
Current through the 2022 Davis Cup.

Mixed doubles

References

External links
 
 
 

1983 births
Living people
Dutch male tennis players
Dutch people of Russian descent 
Sportspeople from Breda 
People from Leerdam
Sportspeople from Utrecht (province)
21st-century Dutch people